Nou Estadi is a multi-purpose stadium in Tarragona, Catalonia, Spain.  It is currently used mostly for football matches and is the home ground of the Gimnàstic de Tarragona. The stadium has a maximum capacity of 14,591 persons.

It hosted opening and closing ceremonies of the 2018 Mediterranean Games.

Images

References

External links
Estadios de Espana 

Gimnàstic de Tarragona
Football venues in Catalonia
Multi-purpose stadiums in Spain
Sports venues completed in 1972